Meesia longiseta is a species of moss belonging to the family Meesiaceae.

It is native to Europe and America.

References

Splachnales